The Young Harris Mountain Lions are the athletic teams that represent Young Harris College, located in Young Harris, Georgia, in intercollegiate sports at the Division II level of the National Collegiate Athletic Association (NCAA), primarily competing in the Peach Belt Conference since the 2013–14 academic year. Young Harris' women's lacrosse program competes as affiliate members of the Gulf South Conference.

Young Harris competes in fifteen intercollegiate varsity sports. Men's sports include baseball, basketball, cross country, golf, lacrosse, soccer, and tennis; while women's sports include basketball, cross country, golf, lacrosse, soccer, softball, tennis, and volleyball.

History
On July 1, 2014, the school completed the transition from the GCAA and the NJCAA to the NCAA at the Division II level. The college originally applied to the NCAA in 2010, but the application was rejected. The school re-applied in 2011 and received acceptance into the three-year process to become a full member. As of the 2011–12 academic year, Young Harris was in the first year of candidacy-membership.

Young Harris later became a member of the PBC, effective July 1, 2012. As part of the transition process into the NCAA, the college began NCAA Division II and Peach Belt Conference schedules for its athletic teams and was immediately eligible for all regular-season championships and other conference awards. During the transition process into the NCAA the college is ineligible for NCAA postseason automatic bids as well as for participation in any PBC Championships which award automatic bids to NCAA Tournaments. As part of the transition to the NCAA, Young Harris reinstated its men's basketball program in 2010, bringing intercollegiate basketball to the college for the first time in 40 years; at the same time, YHC added women's basketball. The college added men's and women's lacrosse teams and a competitive cheerleading team in the 2012–2013 academic year.

Conference affiliations 
NJCAA
 Georgia Collegiate Athletic Association (2010–2011)

NCAA
 Peach Belt Conference (2012–present)
 Conference Carolinas (Beginning 2023)

Varsity teams 
Young Harris also sponsors a co-ed spirit cheer program.

Individual teams

Baseball 
Baseball coach Rick Robinson earned his 500th win at Young Harris in April 2009, and had been highly successful in placing players in Division I schools. The Young Harris baseball team has captured eight Georgia Junior College titles and five Region XVII titles since 1999, and advanced to the Junior College World Series 2007. The team has averaged 49 wins per season each year since 2004. The team plays on Zell B. Miller Field.

Men's basketball 
The school fielded a successful men's basketball team in the 1950s and 1960s. However, the program remained dormant until November 13, 2010, when the sport returned after a 40-year absence, led by former Georgia interim head coach Pete Herrmann. After Herrmann's retirement at the end of the 2017–18 season, Jeremy Currier took the helm of the program.

Men's soccer 
The men's soccer team was a regional finalist in 2006 & 2007. In 1998, led by former coach Jim Thomas, the Mountain Lions won the 1998 NJCAA Division I State Soccer Title.

Women's basketball 
Women's basketball began at Young Harris on November 15, 2010, led by former Mississippi State head coach Brenda Paul. Paul was succeeded by Matt Stearsman, who served most of the 2014–15 season as interim head coach before leading the program as full-time head coach until the end of the 2017–18 season. Longtime Division I head coach Jim Davis then served as the Mountain Lions' head coach for the 2018–19 season. Upon Davis' departure, Lindsey Huffman took the helm of the program and has served as head coach since the 2019–20 season, winning Peach Belt Conference coach of the year honors in her first season.

Women's soccer 
The Young Harris Lady Mountain Lions won the 2006 NJCAA Division I Women's Soccer National Championship, under coach Kathy Brown. Women's soccer coach Kathy Brown originally served as the assistant coach at Jacksonville State before coming to Young Harris in 1997 and starting the women's soccer team. In just her first season as a head coach, Coach Brown celebrated her first state championship. Since then she has led the Lady Mountain Lions to seven more state titles.

Notable alumni

Men's soccer 
 Kevin Coiffic
 Daniel Fischer
 Carlos Gómez
 Ilija Ilić
 Anuar Kanan
 Macauley King
 Marco Micaletto
 Mikie Rowe
 Khurram Shazad
 Yesin van der Pluijm

Women's soccer 
 Kennya Cordner
 Candace Edwards
 Natisha John
 Ahkeela Mollon

References

External links